Treaty United Football Club is an Irish association football club based in Limerick. The club was founded in 2020 following the demise of Limerick F.C. and began playing in the League of Ireland in 2021. They play their home matches at Markets Field, the same ground as their predecessors.

History

Name
The name of the club stems from Limerick's nickname as "The Treaty county", itself a reference to the Treaty of Limerick of 1691, the document which brought an end to the Williamite War in Ireland.

Formation of the club
Following the liquidation of Limerick F.C. in 2019, the idea of a new team in Limerick arose. At first, it was to be called Limerick United but was forced to be changed due to threat of legal action from Limerick FC, because they had previously had that name. The name Treaty United was chosen as Limerick is known as the Treaty County, after the 1691 Treaty of Limerick. Treaty United was confirmed as the name, and the women's team Treaty United W.F.C. was ready to enter the 2020 Women's National League season and the men's the 2020 League of Ireland First Division, but the men's team withdrew their licensing application for the 2020 season. The club went through the licensing procedures the following year however and on 20 February 2021 it was announced by the Football Association of Ireland that the club had been granted a licence and would take part in the 2021 League of Ireland First Division, taking the place of Shamrock Rovers II from the previous season. Thus, the club is a continuation of senior football in Limerick, a story which began in 1937. The club kit, with its red and white stripes, is an ode to the same colours first worn by the Limerick teams of the 1930s. The blue shorts and socks also reflect on the blue kits worn by previous Limerick clubs over the decades, something that has resonated deeply with supporters. The very presence of Treaty in the Markets Field is significant, as this is widely viewed as the historical, spiritual home of Limerick football.

First season
The club announced their 26 man first team squad and backroom staff for their first season in football under manager Tommy Barrett on 27 February 2021. They also announced that the number 4 shirt would be retired as a mark of respect to former Limerick United captain Joe O'Mahony.
The club's first senior men's fixture was a 1–1 draw with Waterford in a pre-season friendly on 2 March 2021, with Limerick local Joel Coustrain getting the honour of scoring the senior men's team's first goal. The senior men's first ever competitive fixture was on the 28 March 2021 as Treaty, captained by Jack Lynch, traveled to the Carlisle Grounds and drew 0–0 with Bray Wanderers to earn their first ever League of Ireland First Division point despite finishing the match with 10 men.

Stadium 
In March 2011 it was announced that the Markets Field had been purchased by the Limerick Enterprise Development Partnership (LEDP) with a charitable donation from the JP McManus Charitable Foundation, with a view towards the former Limerick FC returning to the venue sometime during 2012. The stadium reopened in 2015. It is widely regarded as the spiritual home of Limerick football, with it hosting large soccer ties between former Limerick teams and Liverpool in 1962, along with a UEFA Cup tie against Southampton FC in 1981 and a Cup Winners Cup tie against AZ Alkmaar in 1982.

It was agreed that Treaty would be able to play in the Garryowen venue. This continues a tradition of Limerick football being played in the stadium since the 1930s.

Players

First-team squad

Retired numbers

4 –  Joe O'Mahony

Technical staff

References

 
Association football clubs established in 2020
Association football clubs in County Limerick
2020 establishments in Ireland
League of Ireland First Division clubs